The St. John the Baptist Cathedral  also called Iquitos Cathedral is the main Catholic church in neo-Gothic style in the city of Iquitos in Peru, with an important value in the historic center of the town. It is located specifically in Iquitos Center at the intersection of Arica and Putumayo streets, and is home of Bishop Miguel Olaortua Laspra.

It is a property of the Catholic Church, and was declared Cultural Heritage of the Nation of Peru in 1996, and is considered an urban icon in Iquitos.

Currently, it is the highest religious temple, and one of the assets that are in better condition in that city. Iquitos Cathedral also notable for including a crypt.

Construction of the cathedral began in 1911 after the demolition of the ancient temple and was inaugurated on March 16, 1919, with the tower being finished the 1924.

See also
Roman Catholicism in Peru
St. John the Baptist Cathedral (disambiguation)

References

Roman Catholic cathedrals in Peru
Buildings and structures in Iquitos
Roman Catholic churches completed in 1924
20th-century Roman Catholic church buildings in Peru
Cultural heritage of Peru